Aljona Surzhikova is an Estonian director and writer. She is best known for her work on the documentary films Not my Land and Waiting for a Miracle.

Life and career
Aljona was born in Tallinn, Estonia. She studied television directing at Tallinn University and documentary making at Saint Petersburg State University for Film Industry and Television.

In 2014, Surzhikova won the Best Young Director award from Estonian Cultural Endowment for the film, Not My Land. In 2019, she received the Person of the Year award from Raadio 4 and her TV show project, Stories of Success, was shown on ETV. She also received a special mention at the Jihlava International Documentary Film Festival for her documentary film, Waiting for a Miracle.

Filmography

References

Living people
Estonian film directors
Tallinn University alumni
People from Tallinn
Estonian people of Russian descent
Year of birth missing (living people)